Kilmacnevan is a civil parish in County Westmeath, Ireland.

Kilmacnevan is one of 6 civil parishes in the barony of Moygoish in the Province of Leinster.

Kilmacnevan civil parish comprises 11 townlands: Ballintue, Ballynacarrow, Calliaghstown, Churchtown, Conlanstown, Deerpark, Emper, Kilmacnevan, Lakingstown, Laragh and Rathmore.

The neighbouring civil parishes are: Rathaspick to the north, Kilbixy to the east, Piercetown (barony of Rathconrath) and
Rathconrath (barony of Rathconrath) to the south and Agharra (barony of Shrule, County Longford) and Rathreagh (barony of Ardagh, County Longford) to the west.

References

External links
Kilmacnevan civil parish at the IreAtlas Townland Data Base
Kilmacnevan civil parish at Townlands.ie
Kilmacnevan civil parish at Logainm.ie

Civil parishes of County Westmeath